Sheet Harbour 36 is a Mi'kmaq reserve located in on the Eastern Shore of Nova Scotia, Canada, in the Halifax Regional Municipality. Part of the reserve is located just west of Sheet Harbour, Nova Scotia. The reserve's borders also includes a tract of land directly across the harbour, in the downtown area of Sheet Harbour. Grand Lake borders Sheet Harbour 36 on its western side. It is administratively part of the Millbrook First Nation.

References

Indian reserves in Nova Scotia
Communities in Halifax County, Nova Scotia
Mi'kmaq in Canada